Casa Blanca is an unincorporated community in Cibola County, New Mexico, United States. It is part of the Paraje census-designated place. Casa Blanca has a post office with ZIP code 87007, which opened on September 22, 1905.

References

Unincorporated communities in Cibola County, New Mexico
Unincorporated communities in New Mexico